Fasoli is a surname of Italian origin. Notable people with this surname include:

 Claudio Fasoli (born 1939), Italian jazz-saxophonist and composer of modern jazz
 Ermanno Fasoli (born 1943), Italian boxer
 Michele Pio Fasoli, Italian friar and missionary, companion of the Blessed Johannes Laurentius Weiss

See also 
 Fasolis

Italian-language surnames